Aguilera  may refer to:

 Aguilera (surname), people with the surname Aguilera
 Aguilera (volcano), a mountain in Chile
 La Aguilera, a village in Spain
 Aguilera (album), ninth studio album released by Christina Aguilera